Clements Mountain is located in the Lewis Range, Glacier National Park in the U.S. state of Montana. Clements Mountain rises to the west of Logan Pass and above the Hidden Lake Trail which leads to Hidden Lake just west of the continental divide. The peak was named after Walter M. Clements who had worked to set up a treaty between the Blackfeet and the U.S. Government for the purchase of tribal lands east of the continental divide which later became part of the park.

Geology

Like other mountains in Glacier National Park, Clements Mountain is composed of sedimentary rock laid down during the Precambrian to Jurassic periods.

Climate
Based on the Köppen climate classification, the peak is located in an alpine subarctic climate zone with long, cold, snowy winters, and cool to warm summers. Temperatures can drop below −10 °F with wind chill factors below −30 °F.

See also

 Geology of the Rocky Mountains

References

External links
 Clements Mountain: Weather

Mountains of Glacier County, Montana
Mountains of Flathead County, Montana
Mountains of Glacier National Park (U.S.)
Lewis Range
Mountains of Montana
Going-to-the-Sun Road